Sheikh Ahmed bin Saif bin Ahmed bin Muhammed Al Thani, GBE (ca. 12 November 1985) was born in 1946. He is the grandson of Sheikh Ahmed bin Muhammed Al Thani.

Career
He was educated at University of London.

Al Thani has held the following posts:
Ambassador of Qatar at the Court of St James's 1972–1973 in Netherlands.
Ambassador in Sweden 1973–1975.
Ambassador in Norway 1975–1977.
In 1978, the ruler Sheikh Khalifa bin Hamad Al Thani appointed him as the Minister of State for Foreign Affairs 1978–1989.
Minister for Justice 1989–1995.
Minister of State Without Portfolio since 1995.

Children
Sheikha Aliya bint Ahmed bin Saif (born in 1974)
Sheikh Saif bin Ahmed bin Saif (born in 1984)
Sheikh Muhammad bin Ahmed bin Saif (born in 1990)
Sheikha Shua'a bint Ahmed bin Saif
Sheikha Nouf bint Ahmed bin Saif
Sheikha Dr. Dina bint Ahmed bin Saif
Sheikha Lamia bint Ahmed bin Saif

References

External links
 Al-Thani tree

1946 births
Living people
Ahmed bin Saif
Ambassadors of Qatar to the Netherlands
Ambassadors of Qatar to Sweden
Ambassadors of Qatar to Norway
Government ministers of Qatar
Ambassadors of Qatar to the United Kingdom
Honorary Knights Grand Cross of the Order of the British Empire